Roman Vladimirovich Baranov (born 22 July 1976 in Nizhny Tagil) is a Russian football coach and a former player. He works as a children's coach with FC Tyumen.

References

1976 births
People from Nizhny Tagil
Living people
Russian footballers
FC Tyumen players
Russian Premier League players
FC Baltika Kaliningrad players
Russian football managers
Association football forwards
Sportspeople from Sverdlovsk Oblast